Fumariola is a genus of flowering plants belonging to the family Papaveraceae.

Its native range is Central Asia.

Species:

Fumariola turkestanica

References

Papaveraceae
Papaveraceae genera